This is a list of early settlers of Marietta, Ohio, the first permanent settlement created by United States citizens after the establishment of the Northwest Territory in 1787. The settlers included soldiers of the American Revolutionary War and members of the Ohio Company of Associates.

The first group of these early settlers is sometimes referred to as "the forty-eight" or the "first forty-eight", and also as the "founders of Ohio". These first forty-eight men were carefully chosen and vetted by several of the co-founders of the Ohio Company of Associates, Rufus Putnam and Manasseh Cutler, to ensure not only men of high character and bravery, but also men with proven skills necessary to build a settlement in the wilderness. George Washington said of them: "I know many of the settlers personally, and there never were men better calculated to promote the welfare of such a community." General Lafayette of France, who fought with the Americans during the Revolution, visited Marietta on his US tour during May 1825  and described these pioneers and former officers: "They were the bravest of brave. Better men never lived." The historian David McCullough noted that these pioneers were: "characters of historic accomplishment who were entirely unknown to most Americans".

Under the leadership of Rufus Putnam, two parties of pioneers comprising the first forty-eight men departed New England, cutting trails westward through the mountains during an uncommonly severe winter. One party departed from the towns of Ipswich, Massachusetts and Danvers, Massachusetts on December 3, 1787; the other party departed from Hartford, Connecticut on January 1, 1788. The pioneers crossed the mountains and met at Sumrill's Ferry (present-day West Newton, Pennsylvania) on the Youghiogheny River. During the bitterly cold winter, the men built two flatboats, the forty-five-ton Adventure Galley (also known as the Mayflower, in honor of their Pilgrim ancestors) and the three-ton Adelphia. They also built three log canoes. This small fleet of boats carried the pioneers down the Youghiogheny River to the Monongahela River, and then to the Ohio River, and onward to the Ohio Country and the Northwest Territory. They arrived at their final destination, the mouth of the Muskingum River at the confluence of the Ohio and Muskingum rivers, on April 7, 1788.

First forty-eight, April 1788
THE FOUNDERS OF OHIO
The footsteps of a hundred years
Have echoed, since o'er Braddock's Road
Bold Putnam and the Pioneers
Led History the way they strode.

On wild Monongahela stream
They launched the Mayflower of the West,
A perfect State their civic dream,
A new New World their pilgrim quest.

When April robed the Buckeye trees
Muskingum's bosky shore they trod;
They pitched their tents and to the breeze
Flung freedom's star-flag, thanking God.

As glides the Oyo's solemn flood
So fleeted their eventful years;
Resurgent in their children's blood,
They still live on – the Pioneers.

Their fame shrinks not to names and dates
On votive stone, the prey of time; -
Behold where monumental States
Immortalize their lives sublime!
<div>—William Henry Venable, April 1888.Venable, Saga of the Oak, 50-51.

The first forty-eight pioneers included the following men. This group of pioneers arrived on April 7, 1788, except for Col. Meigs, who arrived five days later on April 12, 1788, and Anselm Tupper, who arrived on April 25, according to Rufus Putnam's journal.
 General Rufus Putnam, superintendent of the settlement, co-founder of the Ohio Company of Associates
 Colonel Return J. Meigs, Sr., surveyor
 Colonel Ebenezer Sproat, surveyor (married to daughter of Commodore Abraham Whipple)
 Major Anselm Tupper, surveyor (son of General Benjamin Tupper)
 John Mathews, surveyor
 Major Haffield White, quartermaster
 Captain Ezekiel Cooper
 Captain Daniel Davis
 Captain Jonathan Devoll (Devol)
 Captain Peregrine Foster
 Captain William Gray
 Captain Josiah Munroe (Munro)
 Captain Jethro Putnam
 Jabez Barlow
 Daniel Bushnell
 Phineas Coburn
 Ebenezer Corey (Cory)
 Samuel Cushing
 Jarvis (Jervis) Cutler (son of Manasseh Cutler)
 Israel Danton
 Jonas Davis
 Allen Devoll
 Gilbert Devoll, Jr.
 Isaac Dodge
 Oliver Dodge
 Samuel Felshaw
 Hezekiah Flint
 Hezekiah Flint, Jr.
 John Gardner
 Benjamin Griswold
 Elizur (Elisur) Kirtland
 Theophilus Leonard (Learned)
 Joseph Lincoln
 Simeon Martin
 Henry Maxom
 William Maxom (Mason)
 William Miller
 William Moulton
 Edmond (Edmund) Moulton
 Amos Porter, Jr.
 Allen Putnam
 Benjamin Shaw
 Earl Sproat
 David Wallace (Wallis)
 Joseph Wells
 Josiah White
 Peletiah White
 Josiah Whitridge

May 1788
LANDING OF THE PIONEERS
At the Mouth of the Muskingum, Ohio, April 7, 1788.
"A song of the Early Times out West,"
And that bold adventurous band
Who first set foot upon these shores
Where now their children stand;
Who fell'd the lordly forest tree
And built the Cabin Home,
Resolved on meeting valiantly
All dangers that might come.
A strong and hardy race were they,
To wield the axe and hoe,
When first they came as Pioneers,
Just sixty years ago!

The April winds swept o'er the hills
And bowed the forest tree,
And wild-wood flowers were blossoming,
And birds were singing free,
The wild deer bounded o'er the plain,
The wolf's long howl was heard
And oft the panther's fearful scream
The stoutest bosom stirr'd,
The wily Indian roam'd the wood
And sprung his bended bow,
When first they came as Pioneers,
Just sixty years ago!

But like a band of brothers then
Our worthy Fathers stood,
And met with firm and cheerful front
The dangers of the wood;
E'en woman's heart grew bold and strong
Amid the toil and fear,
And with unshrinking heart and hand
Gave comfort, aid, and cheer.
Sweet were the social joys of life-
Few others did they know-
When first they came as Pioneers,
Just sixty years ago!

But years rolled on and swept away
Their trials and their foes,
And soon the wilderness was made
To blossom as the rose,
The bleating of the gentle sheep,
The lowing of the kine,
Were heard, where once the panther screamed
In days of Old Lang Syne.
Our worthy Sires, all danger o'er
Now felt life's joyous flow-
Nor mourned that they were Pioneers,
Just sixty years ago!

But few are left to bless us now
Of all the honored band-
And they, ere long, must pass away
Into the spirit land.
Oh may their fleeting years be blest
By Sympathy and Love!
Till God shall call each wanderer home
To dwell with him above.
And may we all by well spent lives,
Of strength and virtue show
We're worthy of the Noble Sires
Of sixty years ago!
<div>—Frances Dana Gage, circa 1848.

Arrivals the following month, May 1788, included:
 General Samuel Holden Parsons
 Colonel John May
 Colonel Israel Putnam (son of General Israel Putnam)
 Colonel William Stacy
 Major Winthrop Sargent
 Captain William Dana
 Aaron Putnam
 Jonathan Stone
 Lisbeth

June 1788
During June 1788, several more settlers arrived, including the first woman settler:
 James Owen and his wife, Mary Owen, the first woman settler
 Dr. Jabez True
 General James Varnum

August 1788
During August 1788, General Benjamin Tupper and his extended family arrived.
 General Benjamin Tupper, co-founder of the Ohio Company of Associates
 Colonel Ichabod Nye and his wife Minerva Nye (daughter of Gen. Tupper)
 Major Asa Coburn
 Andrew Webster
 The Cushing and Goodale families

1788 and 1789
Other notable arrivals included:
 Quartermaster Griffin Greene (cousin of General Nathanael Greene)
 Commodore Abraham Whipple

Legacy
During 1852 the president of the Ohio Historical Society described these pioneers: "So various and eventful lives as theirs have scarcely ever fallen to the lot of man. They were born under a monarchy,—fought the battle of Independence,—assisted in the baptism of a great republic,—then moved into a wilderness,—and laid the foundations of a State,—itself almost equaling an empire. These men not only lived in remarkable times, but were themselves remarkable men. Energetic, industrious, persevering, honest, bold, and free — they were limited in their achievements only by the limits of possibility. Successful alike in field and forest,—they have, at length, gone to their rest,—leaving names which are a part of the fame and the history of their country". On the centennial anniversary of the Marietta settlement, Senator George F. Hoar of Massachusetts orated, "It was an illustrious band; they were men of exceptional character, talents and attainments; they were the best of New England culture; they were Revolutionary heroes".

"Can too much be said in praise of the noble heroes who opened to settlement the Great Northwest Territory? These men had been trained in army life and discipline and were anxious to take this country as the payment due them for military service. They were men who had fought valiantly to preserve the principles of their government and were ready for other great achievements. They were men who had assisted in making this territory a part of the United States and had, in great measure, assisted in the formation and adoption of the Ordinance of 1787 which was to govern it. Indeed, a better company of men could scarcely have been selected than those who were directed by General Putnam."

"The forty-eight persons who disembarked from the 'Adventure Galley' at the mouth of the Muskingum, April 7, 1788, had come out into the wilderness to lay the corner-stone of one of the greatest political edifices that has ever sheltered millions of brave, prosperous and happy freemen. They were certainly the progenitors of the state builders of the great Northwest. Within fifty years of their coming, Ohio had a million and a half of people, and had already made such rapid strides in its internal improvement, its systems of navigation, its jurisprudence, and its enlargement of public education, as to become an example to some of the older states."

These early American pioneers to the Northwest Territory have been memorialized in verse and book. The poem, Landing of the Pioneers, was written sixty years after the landing by Frances Dana Gage, and included in her book of poems published in 1867. The poem, The Founders of Ohio, was written in 1888 during the centennial of the event by William Henry Venable, and was published later in several books of poems. The book Pioneer History (1848) by Samuel Prescott Hildreth describes the early civil history of the Northwest Territory in Ohio; Hildreth's book Early Pioneer Settlers of Ohio (1852) provides biographies of the earliest settlers.

Many of these early pioneers are buried in Marietta at Mound Cemetery.

In 1888, the Adventure Galley III recreated the journey of the original pioneer 'Adventure Galley'. In 1984 this journey was again recreated aboard the Adventure Galley II (actually the fourth boat by the name Adventure Galley), captained by Vaughn P. Wendland. This Adventure Galley IV is on display at the Behringer-Crawford museum in Cincinnati, Ohio.

References

Film
 Opening the Door West, aired on Ohio PBS during the 2003 Ohio Bicentennial, available on DVD, Shelburne Films, Reedsville, Ohio (2003). The film website is located at Opening the Door West.

Bibliography
 Andrews, Martin R.: History of Marietta and Washington County, Ohio and Representative Citizens, Biographical Publishing Company, Chicago, Illinois (1902).
 Barker, Joseph: Recollections of the First Settlement of Ohio, Marietta College, Marietta, Ohio (1958) original manuscript written late in Joseph Barker's life, prior to his death in 1843.
 
 
 Edes, Richard S. and William M.  Darlington, eds. Journal and Letters of Col. John May, of Boston. Robert Clarke and Company, Cincinnati, Ohio (1873). Available on Google Book Search.
 Gage, Frances Dana: Poems, J. H. Lippincott and Co, Philadelphia (1867) pp. 199–201.
 Hawley, Owen: Mound Cemetery, Marietta, Ohio, Washington County Historical Society, Marietta, Ohio (1996).
 Hildreth, S. P.: Biographical and Historical Memoirs of the Early Pioneer Settlers of Ohio, H. W. Derby and Co., Cincinnati, Ohio (1852).
 
 
 
 Kennedy, James: History of the Ohio Society of New York 1885-1905, The Grafton Press, New York (1906) pp. 183–84.
 
 McCullough, David: The Pioneers: The Heroic Story of the Settlers Who Brought the American Ideal West, Simon & Schuster Paperbacks, New York (2020).
 
 Sparks, Jared: The Writings of George Washington, Vol. IX, Harper and Brothers, New York (1847) p. 385.
 Stevenson, Burton Egbert: Poems of American History, Houghton Mifflin Co, Boston and New York (1908) p. 335.
 
 Venable, William H.: Saga of the Oak and Other Poems, Dodd, Mead, and Co., New York (1904) pp. 50–51.
 Zimmer, Louise: More True Stories from Pioneer Valley, published by Sugden Book Store, Marietta, Ohio (1993).
 Zimmer, Louise: True Stories from Pioneer Valley, published by Broughton Foods Company, Marietta, Ohio (1987).

 
People from Marietta, Ohio
Pre-statehood history of Ohio
Northwest Territory
 
1788 in the United States
Settlement schemes in the United States
Marietta